The Snickelways of York, often misspelt Snickleways, are a collection of narrow streets and alleys in the city of York, England. The word Snickelway was coined by local author Mark W. Jones in 1983 in his book A Walk Around the Snickelways of York, and is a portmanteau of the words snicket, meaning a passageway between walls or fences, ginnel, a narrow passageway between or through buildings, and alleyway, a narrow street or lane. Although the word is a neologism, it quickly became part of the local vocabulary, and has even been used in official council documents, for example when giving notice of temporary footpath closures.

Definition

The snickelways themselves are usually small paths or lanes between buildings, not wide enough for a vehicle to pass down, and usually public rights of way. Jones provides the following definition for them:

York has many such paths, mostly mediaeval, though there are some modern paths as well. They have names like any other city street, often quirky names such as Mad Alice Lane, Nether Hornpot Lane and even Finkle Street (formerly Mucky Peg Lane).

A Walk around the Snickelways of York 

In 1983 Jones devised a walk taking in 50 snickelways within the city walls. His book, A Walk around the Snickelways of York, soon became a local bestseller. It was unusual in being completely hand-written rather than using typeset printed text, with hand-drawn illustrations, a technique which Jones acknowledged as inspired by the Pictorial Guides of Alfred Wainwright. At least nine editions of the book have been published, each revision incorporating necessary changes, such as the closure of snickelways which were not public rights of way or the opening of new paths.

The popularity of the book led to the author being called to present talks on the Snickelways, complete with a slide show. This in turn led to the publication in 1991 of an expanded, hardback book, The Complete Snickelways of York. This combined the original hand-written text with printed text and photographs. It also included information about Snickelways and other footpaths in the suburbs of York.

Gallery

See also
Other terms for alley
The Snickleway Inn
Vennels of Perth

References 

Streets in York
Tourist attractions in York